is a city and port in Shiribeshi Subprefecture, Hokkaido, Japan, northwest of Sapporo. The city faces Ishikari Bay and the Sea of Japan, and has long served as the main port of the bay. With its many historical buildings, Otaru is a popular tourist destination. Because it is a 25-minute drive from Sapporo, it has recently grown as a bedroom community.

As of July 31, 2019, the city has an estimated population of 115,333 and a population density of 474.37 persons per km2 (1,228.6 persons per sq. mi.). Although it is the largest city in Shiribeshi Subprefecture, the subprefecture's capital is the more centrally located Kutchan.

History 
The city was an Ainu habitation, and the name "Otaru" is recognised as being of Ainu origin, possibly meaning "River running through the sandy beach". The very small remaining part of the Temiya Cave contains carvings from the Zoku-Jōmon period of Ainu history, around A.D. 400. Mount Akaiwa (Northwest part of Otaru) is memorialized in the Ainu tradition in the story of Sitonai, village chief's teenage daughter who had slain a white snake from the mountain's cave that demanded sacrifices of girls every year. The legend explains the name of a big cave on Mount Akaiwa, Hakuryu Gongen Cave (白竜権現洞窟, lit. White Dragon Gongen Cave) and the reason why a shrine was built on the mountain (to protect the village from being haunted by the snake).

Otaru was recognised as a village by the bakufu in 1865, and in 1880 the first railway line in Hokkaido was opened with daily service between Otaru and Sapporo.

An Imperial decree in July 1899 established Otaru as an open port for trading with the United States and the United Kingdom.

The city flourished well as the financial and business center in Hokkaido as well as the trade port with Japanese ruled southern Sakhalin until the 1920s. Otaru was redesignated as a city on August 1, 1922.

On December 26, 1924, a freight train loaded with 600 cases of dynamite exploded in Temiya Station, damaging the warehouse, the harbour facilities, and the surrounding area. Local officials stated that at least 94 were killed and 200 injured in this disaster.

During World War II, Otaru housed a prison camp for Aleuts taken there following the Japanese occupation of Attu. During the closing stages of the war, Otaru was bombed by American naval aircraft in July 1945.

Since the 1950s, as the coal industry around the city went into a decline, the status of the economic hub shifted from Otaru to Sapporo.

Geography 

Otaru is a port town on the coast of the Sea of Japan in northern Shiribeshi Subprefecture. The southern portion of the city is characterized by the steep slopes of various mountains (notably Tenguyama), where the altitude of the land sharply drops from the mountains to the sea. The land available between the coast and mountains has been almost completely developed, and the developed part of the city on the mountain slopes is called Saka-no-machi, or "Hill town", including hills named Funamizaka (Boat-view Hill) and Jigokuzaka (Hell Hill).

Neighboring cities and towns
Shiribeshi
Yoichi District: Yoichi, Akaigawa
Ishikari
Sapporo (Teine-ku, Minami-ku), Ishikari

Rivers
Some of the rivers in Otaru are: Hoshioki, Kiraichi, Zenibako, Hariusu, Asari, Katsunai, Shioya, Myoken, Irifune.

Climate 

List of mayors (from 1923 to present)

Transportation 
 JR Hokkaido Station
 Hakodate Main Line : Ranshima – Shioya – Otaru – Minami-Otaru – Otaru-Chikkō – Asari – Zenibako
 Otaru Port Ferry Terminal(A Shin Nihonkai Ferry operates two ferries daily)

Education

Universities

National
 Otaru University of Commerce

Colleges
Otaru Junior College

High schools

Public
 Hokkaido Otaru Choryo High School
 Hokkaido Otaru Ouyou High School
 Hokkaido Otaru Fisheries High School
 Hokkaido Otaru Create Futures High School

Former
 Hokkaido Otaru Commercial High School
 Hokkaido Otaru Technical High School

Private
 Futaba Gakuen High School
 Hokusho High School
 Otaru Meihou High School

Notable attractions 

A canal adorned with Victorian-style street lamps runs through Otaru. The city attracts a large number of Japanese tourists as well as Russian visitors.

A popular attraction on the west side of the city is Nishin Goten (herring mansion). This large wooden building was built in 1897 and was once the house of Fukumatsu Tanaka, a magnate of the fishing industry. It was originally built in nearby Tomari village and moved in 1958. Visitors can clearly see the difference between the squalid conditions of the first floor sleeping quarters of 120 workers and the ground floor luxury of the magnate's rooms.

Another notable building is the Sakaushi residence, constructed by Yoshiya Tanoue, a pupil of Frank Lloyd Wright.

The Tomioka Catholic church is also a popular spot. Many of the buildings have been designated as landmark architecture.

Otaru is well known for its beer, and Otaru Beer, next to the canal, is a popular restaurant with a medieval theme. Otaru is also known for its fresh sushi. Another food attraction unique to Otaru is the rainbow tower ice cream. The town also has substantial shopping arcades and bazaars, but fewer than nearby Sapporo.

Otaru's prominent industries are arts and crafts, such as studio glass and musical boxes. Of the latter, it maintains the Otaru Music Box Museum.

Tenguyama 

Otaru is an important port for Sapporo, and part of this hilly city is on the lower slopes of Tenguyama, a good place for skiing and other winter sports and one that is accessible via Otaru Tenguyama Ropeway.

Sister cities 
  Nakhodka, Russia
  Dunedin, New Zealand
  Gangseo District, Seoul, South Korea

Notable people 
 Seiji Aochi, ski jumper and Olympic medalist (1972 Winter Olympics)
 Yōko Asagami, Japanese voice actress (Space Battleship Yamato and City Hunter)
 Gennosuke Fuse, anatomist of the Meiji period 
 Sei Itō, Japanese poet, novelist, and translator
 Chiaki Kawamata, Japanese science fiction writer and critic (Emblem of Roto)
 Yukie Kawamura, Japanese gravure idol, tarento, and actress
 Hinako Kitano, actress and model (ex-Nogizaka46)
 Masaki Kobayashi, Japanese film director (The Human Condition, Harakiri, Samurai Rebellion and Kwaidan)
 Takiji Kobayashi, Japanese author of proletarian literature
 Masaru Konuma, Japanese film director (Roman Porno)
 Kōtetsuyama Toyoya, sumo wrestler (Real Name: Kōnoshin Suga, Nihongo: 菅 孝之進, Suga Kōnoshin)
 Natsuhiko Kyogoku, Japanese mystery writer, member of the Mystery Writers of Japan and the Honkaku Mystery Writers Club of Japan
 Motosaburo Masuyama, Japanese statistician
 Hideharu Miyahira, ski jumper
 Nobuko Miyamoto, Japanese actress
 Tetsuya Mizuguchi, video game designer and co-founder of Q Entertainment
 Takiko Mizunoe, Japanese actress, film producer, radio personality and TV presenter
 Maki Murakami, Japanese manga artist (Gravitation)
 Hideo Murota, Japanese actor (Shinde mo ii)
 Nobuo Nakamura, Japanese actor (Ikiru and Tokyo Story)
 Tetsuya Okabe, Alpine ski racer
 Hibiki Ōtsuki, Japanese AV actress and idol singer
 Sarah Midori Perry, musician (Kero Kero Bonito)
 Yoko Takahashi, Japanese female mixed martial arts fighter, kickboxer and former boxer and professional wrestler
 Miyoshi Umeki, Academy Award-winning Japanese actress and standards singer
 Hirokazu Yagi, ski jumper
 Akiko Yamanaka, Japanese politician
 Ichiro Yamaguchi, musician (Sakanaction)
 Sawao Yamanaka, musician (The Pillows)
 Kazumi Yamashita, manga artist (The Life of Genius Professor Yanagizawa)

See also 
 Otaru Station
 Otaru University of Commerce
 Rising Sun Rock Festival
 [Otaru Amato]

References

External links

 Official Website 

 
Cities in Hokkaido
Port settlements in Japan
Populated coastal places in Japan